Tokyopop (styled TOKYOPOP; formerly known as Mixx Entertainment) is an American distributor, licensor and publisher of anime, manga, manhwa and Western manga-style works.

Books published in English by Tokyopop
Unless otherwise noted all titles listed in this section are out of print.

Manga
Besides the abbreviated list below, many titles may be found within :Category:Tokyopop titles.

At various times in its history, Tokyopop has published books under the Pocket Mixx, Mixx Manga Premium Edition, Chix Comix, TOKYOPOP manga, and TOKYOPOP imprints.

Popular shonen manga series 

 Beck (Now published by ComiXology)
 GetBackers
 Girls Bravo
 GTO (Now published by Kodansha USA)
 Love Hina (Now published by Kodansha USA)
 Rave Master (Now published by Kodansha USA)
 Saiyuki (Now published by Kodansha USA)
 Saiyuki Reload (Now published by Kodansha USA)
 Samurai Deeper Kyo (Now published by Del Rey Manga)
 Sgt. Frog (Now published by Viz Media)

Popular shōjo manga series 

 Cardcaptor Sakura (Now published by Kodansha USA)
 Dazzle
 Fruits Basket (Now published by Yen Press)
 Gakuen Alice
 Kare Kano: His and Her Circumstances (Kareshi Kanojo no Jijō)
 Magic Knight Rayearth (Now published by Kodansha USA)
 Marmalade Boy (Now published by Seven Seas Entertainment)
 Peach Girl
 Pita Ten
 Pixie Pop
 Sailor Moon (Now published by Kodansha USA)
 Tokyo Mew Mew (Now published by Kodansha USA)

Popular seinen manga series 

 Ai Yori Aoshi
 Battle Royale
 Battle Vixens
 BLAME! (Now published by Vertical (company))
 Bus Gamer
 Chobits (Now published by Kodansha USA)
 If My Favorite Pop Idol Made It to the Budokan, I Would Die
 Lupin III
 Mobile Suit Gundam titles
 Planetes (Now published by Dark Horse Comics)

Popular josei manga series 

 Double
 Happy Mania
 Tramps Like Us (Kimi wa Petto) (republished digitally by comixology)

Manhwa 

 Angel cup
 Arcana
 Archlord
 Aspirin
 Ark Angels
 Blazin' Barrels
 Bird Kiss
 Blade of Heaven
 Chronicles of the Cursed Sword
 Chrono Code (Riverside)
 Ciel
 Crazy Love Story
 Demon Diary
 Dragon Hunter
 Faeries' Landing
 Good Luck
 Heaven Above Heaven
 Honey Mustard
 I Wish
 iD eNTITY
 In Dream World
 I.N.V.U.
 Island
 Kill Me, Kiss Me
 King of Hell
 Les Bijoux
 Lights Out
 Love or Money or Money
 One
 Phantom
 PhD: Phantasy Degree
 Priest
 The Tarot Café
 The Queen's Knight
 Threads of Time
 Ragnarok
 Rebirth
 Rure
 Saver
 Snow Drop
 Under the Glass Moon
 Visitor
 Warcraft: The Sunwell Trilogy

Manhua 
 Digimon

Original English-language manga 

 @Large
 The Abandoned
 Afterlife
 A Midnight Opera
 Bad Kitty
 Bizenghast
 Boys of Summer
 CSI: Crime Scene Investigation
 Dæmonium (2008)
 The Dark Goodbye
 Dogby Walks Alone
 Dramacon
 Earthlight
 eV
 The Faerie Path: Lamia's Revenge
 Fool's Gold
 Ghostbusters
 Idiotz!
 I Luv Halloween
 Legends of the Dark Crystal
 Mail Order Ninja
 Mark of the Succubus
 My Dead Girlfriend
 MBQ
 My Cat Loki
 Off Beat
 Orange Crows
 Pantheon High
 Peach Fuzz
 Psy-Comm
 RE:Play
 Return to Labyrinth
 Rhysmyth
 Rising Stars of Manga
 Roadsong
 Sea Princess Azuri
 ShutterBox
 Snow
 Sokora Refugees
 Sorcerers & Secretaries
 Star Trek
 Steady Beat
 The Dreaming
 The Ocean of Secrets
 Undertown
 Van Von Hunter
 War on Flesh
 Warcraft: Death Knight
 Warcraft: Legends
 Warcraft: The Sunwell Trilogy (manhwa)
 Warriors Manga
 "We Shadows" by Sonny Strait
 Wicked Lovely: Desert Tales
 Work Bites
 World of Hartz
 Still Sick
 Parham Itan: Tales From Beyond
 Dirty Darling
 Dekoboko Sugar Days
 RePlay

Original German-language manga 
 Gothic Sports
 Plastic Chew (released in Germany as Prussian Blue)
 Yonen Buzz
 Goldfisch
 Breath of Flowers
 Blue Lust
 Mädchen in all ihren Farben
 Citrus+
 Fragtime

Novels 

 .hack//AI buster
 .hack//Another Birth
 The Adventures of Duan Surk
 Clamp School Paranormal Investigators
 Chain Mail
 Chibi Vampire
 Crest of the Stars
 Gravitation
 Gundam Seed
 Kino no Tabi
 Love Hina
 Magic Moon
 Sailor Moon
 Scrapped Princess
 Slayers
 Trinity Blood
 Twelve Kingdoms
 Full Metal Panic
 Welcome to the NHK

Cine-Manga 

 The Adventures of Jimmy Neutron, Boy Genius
 Akira
 Aladdin
 All Grown Up!
 The Amanda Show
 Astro Boy
 Avatar: The Last Airbender
 Bambi
 Linkin Park: Breaking the Habit
 Buffy the Vampire Slayer
 Cardcaptors
 Cars
 Code Lyoko
 Drake & Josh
 The Fairly OddParents
 Family Guy
 Finding Nemo
 Greatest Stars of the NBA
 The Incredibles
 Jackie Chan Adventures
 Kim Possible
 Lilo & Stitch: The Series
 Lizzie McGuire
 Madagascar
 Malcolm in the Middle
 Monsters, Inc.
 Power Rangers
 Rave Master
 Shrek 2
 The Simple Life
 SpongeBob SquarePants
 Spy Kids
 Teenage Mutant Ninja Turtles
 That's So Raven
 Totally Spies
 Yo Gabba Gabba!

Picture books
 Stray Sheep

Soundtracks

 Chrono Trigger Official Soundtrack
 Final Fantasy IV Official Soundtrack
 Final Fantasy: N Generation - Official Best Collection
 Final Fantasy: S Generation - Official Best Collection
 Final Fantasy IX: Uematsu's Best Selection
 Final Fantasy X: Official Soundtrack
 Trigun Spicy Stewed Donut
 Sonic Adventure 2 Soundtrack

Anime licensed in English by Tokyopop

 Brigadoon [TV-PG]
 Great Teacher Onizuka [TV-PG/TV-14] (Now licensed by Discotek Media)
 Initial D [TV-PG] (Now licensed by Funimation)
 Marmalade Boy [TV-PG] (Now licensed by Discotek Media)
 Psychic Academy [TV-PG]
 Rave Master [TV-Y7 FV]
 Samurai Girl: Real Bout High School [TV-PG V]
 Reign: The Conqueror [TV-14]
 Saint Tail [TV-Y7]
 Spring and Chaos [TV-PG]
 Vampire Princess Miyu [TV-14] (Now licensed by Maiden Japan)

Frontier Martial-Arts Wrestling
Tokyopop has also produced a number of Frontier Martial-Arts Wrestling (FMW) videos in the US. So far they have produced 14 volumes featuring different matches from the now-defunct legendary wrestling organization. 

Volume 1- FMW: The Legend Dawns
Volume 2- FMW: King of the Death Match
Volume 3- FMW: Crash and Burn
Volume 4- FMW: Total Carnage
Volume 5- FMW: Ring of Torture
Volume 6- FMW: Torn Shreds
Volume 7- FMW: Yokohama Deathmatch
Volume 8- FMW: Flying Assassin
Volume 9- FMW: International Slaughter House
Volume 10- FMW: The Judgement
Volume 11- FMW: The Enforcer
Volume 12- FMW: War of Attrition
Volume 13- FMW: Rule The Asylum
Volume 14- FMW: Final Encounter

Vol 1-6 contain scripted commentary with Eric Gellar and John Watanabe hosting and doing play-by-play, the volumes also have alternate Japanese commentary. Vol 7-14 replaces Eric Gellar with Dan Lovranski and the extra Japanese commentary is removed aside from the DVD extras.

Books published in German by Tokyopop

Manga 

 +Anima
 100% Strawberry
 Aqua
 Azumanga Daioh
 Bakuman.
 Beck
 Beelzebub
 Bleach
 Blue Dragon Ral Grado
 Bobobo-bo Bo-bobo
 Boogiepop Dual
 Buso Renkin
 Butterfly
 Cherry Juice
 Chonchu
 Ciel
 Comic Party
 Confidential Confessions
 Crazy for You
 Crescent Moon
 Crimson Spell
 Cromartie High School
 Dance in the Vampire Bund
 Nijigahara Holograph (as Das Feld des Regenbogens)
 Dazzle
 D.Gray-man
 D.V.D.
 Deadman Wonderland(Only 1-5)
 Death Note
 DearS
 Devil May Cry 3 (Manga)
 Glass Wings (as Der Prinz mit den gläsernen Schwingen)
 Desert Coral
 DOLL
 Lament of the Lamb (as Das Lied der Lämmer)
 Your and My Secret (as Dein und mein Geheimnis)
 Elfen Lied
 Emma
 Strawberry Marshmallow (as Erdbeeren & Marshmallows)
 Evergrey
 Extra Heavy Syrup
 Finder Series
 A Foreign Love Affair
 Beyond the Beyond (as Futabas (höchst) seltsame Reise)
 Fruits Basket
 Gata Pishi
 Ren'ai Shijō Shugi (as Gib mir Liebe!)
 Gintama
 Gravitation EX
 Grenadier
 Grimms Manga
 Happy Lesson
 Honey and Clover
 Honey x Honey Drops
 Katekyō Hitman Reborn! (as Reborn!)
 Little Butterfly (as Kleiner Schmetterling)
 Kedamono Damono Synopsis (as Kleines Biest)
 Challengers (as Küss mich, Student!)
 Kodocha
 The Legend of Zelda
 Shiiku Hime (as Lektionen der Liebe)
 Love Triangle
 Manga Trainer
 Meine Liebe
 Metamo Kiss
 The First King Adventure (as Der kleine König Valum)
 Ibara no Ō (as König der Dornen)
 A Girl on the Shore (as Mädchen am Strand)
 Pandora Hearts
 The Prince of Tennis
 Rosario + Vampire
 Rosario + Vampire Season II
 Rozen Maiden
 Maria-sama ga Miteru (as Rosen unter Marias Obhut)
 Sgt. Frog
 St. Dragon Girl
 St. Dragon Girl Miracle
 Uchi no Tantei Shirimasen ka (as Suspicious (F)acts) 
 Ultra Cute
 Vassalord.
What a Wonderful World!
 Yotsuba&!
 Zombiepowder
Erica Sakurazawa
Between the Sheets
Angel
Angel Nest
The Rules of Love
Nothing But Loving You
The Aromatic Bitters I
The Aromatic Bitters II
Angel Town

Manhwa 

 Ami, Queen of Hearts
 ArchLord
 Ark Angels
 Banya
 Crazy Love Story
 Demon Diary
 Devil's Bride
 Die 11. Katze
 Die Legenden vom Traumhändler
 Faeries' Landing
 Fantamir
 I.N.V.U.
 King of Hell
 Kumiho
 Legend
 Les Bijoux
 Love Virus

Manhua 
 Bye Bye Baby!
 Comic Schule
 The Flower Ring
 Sweet As Candy
 White Night Melody

Original English-language manga 

 @Large
 A Midnight Opera
 Bizenghast
 Dramacon
 I Luv Halloween
 Peach Fuzz
 ShutterBox
 Sokora Refugees

Original German-language manga 

 Gothic Sports
 In The end
 Iscel
 Krähen
 Life Tree's Guardian
 Manga-Fieber
 Sketchbook Berlin
 Struwwelpeter: Das große Buch der Störenfriede
 Struwwelpeter: Die Rückkehr
 Tränen eines Engels
 Yonen Buzz

Books published in Japanese by Tokyopop

Manga

Cine-Manga 
 Star Wars Episodes I–VI

References